The second season of The Real Housewives of Atlanta, an American reality television series, was broadcast on Bravo. It aired from July 30, 2009 until November 12, 2009, and was primarily filmed in Atlanta, Georgia. Its executive producers are Lauren Eskelin, Lorraine Haughton, Glenda Hersh, Carlos King, Steven Weinstock and Andy Cohen.

The Real Housewives of Atlanta focuses on the lives of NeNe Leakes, Shereé Whitfield, Lisa Wu-Hartwell, Kim Zolciak and Kandi Burruss. It consisted of sixteen episodes.

This season marked the final regular appearance of Lisa Wu.

Production and crew
The season premiered "The Lost Footage" which was aired on October 7, 2008, and centered on unseen footage of the season prior. The season officially began with "New Attitude, Same ATL" on July 30, 2009, while the thirteenth episode "Catwalks & Cat Fights" served as the season finale, and was aired on October 22, 2009. It was followed by a two-part reunion special that aired on  October 29, and November 5, 2009 and this season's lost footage episode which marked the conclusion of the season and was broadcast on November 12, 2009. Lauren Eskelin, Lorraine Haughton, Glenda Hersh, Carlos King, and Steven Weinstock are recognized as the series' executive producers; it is produced and distributed by True Entertainment, an American subsidiary of the Italian corporation Endemol.

Cast and synopsis
Shortly after season 1, DeShawn Snow revealed she had been let go from the series and alleged that producers considered her to be "too human for a circus show" and was replaced by former Xscape member Kandi Burruss. Burruss had recently become engaged to her boyfriend A.J. and expressed interest in reviving her music career. During the second season, an attempted reconciliation between Leakes, Whitfield, and Zolciak failed to come to fruition, while a feud developed between Leakes and Burruss after the latter became friends with Zolciak and helped her record her single "Tardy for the Party". Meanwhile, Zolciak attempted to launch her own wig line and became engaged to Big Papa, while Wu-Hartwell and Whitfield launched their own clothing collections.

Episodes

References

External links

2009 American television seasons
Atlanta (season 2)